Ceresville is an unincorporated community in Frederick County, Maryland.

Unincorporated communities in Maryland